The Nice Synagogue is a historic synagogue in Nice, Alpes-Maritimes, France. It was built in 1885, and dedicated in 1886. It has been listed as an official national monument since April 17, 2004.

References

Synagogues completed in 1886
Monuments historiques of Nice
Synagogues in France